Islander is a 2006 American drama film directed by Ian McCrudden and starring Thomas Hildreth, Amy Jo Johnson, Mark Kiely, Larry Pine, James Parks, Ron Canada, Judy Prescott and Philip Baker Hall.

Cast
Thomas Hildreth as Eben Cole
Amy Jo Johnson as Cheryl
Mark Kiely as Jimmy
Larry Pine as Old Man Cole
James Parks as Pokey
Ron Canada as T. Hardy
Judy Prescott as Emily Bess
Philip Baker Hall as Popper
Emma Ford as Sara
Zach Batchelder as Wyatt Bess
Mackenzie Young as Young Sara

Release
The film premiered at the LA Film Festival on June 25, 2006.

Reception
The film has an 88% rating on Rotten Tomatoes based on eight reviews.

Justin Chang of Variety gave the film a positive review and wrote, "Without spelling itself out too emphatically, pic movingly acknowledges the redeeming bonds of friendship within an enclosed community, as well as the importance of making peace with one’s decisions and moving on."

Wesley Morris of The Boston Globe also gave the film a positive review and wrote, "It's a small, plaintive, modestly made film about how one bad decision can wreck a life."

References

External links
 
 

2006 films
2006 drama films
American drama films
2000s English-language films
2000s American films